Smuggler's Island is a 1951 American Technicolor film noir adventure film directed by Edward Ludwig starring Jeff Chandler and Evelyn Keyes

Chandler called the film one of his favourites because "I played myself". Around this time Chandler typically played characters of varying nationalities from different historical periods; this was a rare opportunity for him to play a contemporary American.

"This is the most conscious effort made so far to sell the Chandler personality per se", he said. "Just plain Jeff Chandler – a nondescript American down on his luck. Filming started in June 1950.

Plot

Steve Kent's boat is repossessed in Macao, leaving him without a way to make his living as a deep sea diver. At a casino, he is introduced to wealthy and beautiful Vivian Craig, who at first seems interest in Steve romantically, then lets him know that what she needs more is his diving expertise.

Agreeing to search for medical supplies lost in a plane crash, Steve goes underwater and locates them. Vivian goes along, and when one of the crates breaks open, Steve sees it actually contains a shipment of stolen gold.

At first he intends to turn over Vivian to the authorities, but his attraction to her keeps Steve from doing so. Allan Craig, her husband, then turns up, after the gold. He offers his wife and Steve a three-way split to retrieve the bullion, but after double-crossing them, Allan gets his comeuppance when the boat explodes.

Cast
 Jeff Chandler as Steve Kent 
 Evelyn Keyes as Vivian Craig
 Philip Friend as Allan Craig 
 Marvin Miller as Bok-Ying 
 Ducky Louie as Kai Lun
 David Bauer as Lorca (as David Wolfe)
 Jay Novello as Espinosa
 H. T. Tsiang as Chang

Production
The original cast announced for the film was Märta Torén, Dick Powell and Robert Douglas. Evelyn Keyes had just signed a contract with Universal to make nine films over seven years of which this was the first.

References

External links

1951 films
1950s English-language films
1951 adventure films
Films set in Hong Kong
Films set in Macau
Seafaring films
Treasure hunt films
Underwater action films
Universal Pictures films
American adventure films
1950s American films